Hyposmocoma kapakai is a species of moth of the family Cosmopterigidae. It is endemic to Oahu. The type locality is the south-east coastal region.

The wingspan is 10.9–13.2 mm.

Adults were reared from case-making larvae collected on the coast at sea level. Larvae were reared on fish food and carrots. Larvae were sparsely distributed along the shoreline region.

External links
Three new species of Hyposmocoma (Lepidoptera, Cosmopterigidae) from the Hawaiian Islands, based on morphological and molecular evidence

K
Endemic moths of Hawaii
Biota of Oahu
Moths described in 2008